The Dorothy Quincy Homestead  is a US National Historic Landmark at 34 Butler Road in Quincy, Massachusetts. The house was originally built by Edmund Quincy II in 1686 who had an extensive property upon which there were multiple buildings. Today, the site consists of the Dorothy Quincy Homestead, which has been preserved as a museum and is open occasionally to the public.

History
The original property covered approximately  extending from its present location to Quincy Bay and included the Dorothy Quincy House (1686), the Josiah Quincy House (1770), and the Josiah Quincy Mansion (1848). The Josiah Quincy Mansion, located on the property purchased by the Eastern Nazarene College in 1919, was torn down in 1969.

The Quincy family was one of the leading families of Massachusetts in from the 17th century to the 19th century. Descendants included several prominent Edmund Quincys and Josiah Quincys, and John Quincy Adams by virtue of his mother, American First Lady Abigail Adams. They settled in what is now Quincy in the 1630s.

The present Homestead was initially built by Edmund Quincy II. It became a meeting place for many American Revolutionary War patriots such as John Adams, Colonel John Quincy, and John Hancock. It was the childhood home of the first First Lady of Massachusetts, Dorothy Quincy Hancock Scott, wife of John Hancock.

Preservation
Representing the evolution of over 320 years of American architecture, the Dorothy Quincy House combines Colonial, Georgian and Victorian design. It is one of the rare Massachusetts examples in which the elements of a 17th-century building are still clearly visible although surrounded by later styles. In 2005 the Quincy Homestead was designated as a National Historic Landmark.

The Homestead is owned by the Commonwealth of Massachusetts and operated by The National Society of the Colonial Dames of America in a public-private partnership. In 1904, when the property was threatened by encroaching urban development, a citizen drive was established to save the mansion. Led by the Massachusetts Colonial Dames and Charles Francis Adams, Jr., the grandson of President John Quincy Adams, Quincy residents raised funds to assist the Dames in purchasing the estate and creating a distinctive house museum. Looking to the long-term protection and presentation of the property, the Colonial Dames then negotiated a sale-leaseback agreement with the Commonwealth, whereby the Commonwealth accepted responsibility for capital improvements and the exterior preservation of the house, and the Dames agreed to maintain the interior of the home, to beautify it with period furniture and decorative arts, and to interpret its history to the public. This relationship has continued for over a century.

Since 2005, the Dorothy Quincy Homestead has undergone a comprehensive exterior renovation to restore this stately historic building to its former grandeur. The project has included painting the structure, re-glazing the windows, and other major improvements.

Gallery

See also
Quincy Mansion
Josiah Quincy House
Quincy family
List of the oldest buildings in Massachusetts
List of National Historic Landmarks in Massachusetts
National Register of Historic Places listings in Quincy, Massachusetts

References

External links
NSCDA Official Website (accessed March 18, 2015)

National Historic Landmarks in Massachusetts
Quincy Homestead
Quincy family homestead
Museums in Quincy, Massachusetts
Houses in Quincy, Massachusetts
National Register of Historic Places in Quincy, Massachusetts
National Society of the Colonial Dames of America
Houses on the National Register of Historic Places in Norfolk County, Massachusetts